The 1907–08 Missouri Tigers men's basketball team represented University of Missouri in the 1907–08 college basketball season. The team was led by first year head coach A.M. Ebright.  The captain of the team was H.A. Henley for the second year in a row.

Missouri finished with an 8–10 record overall and a 0–8 record in the Missouri Valley Intercollegiate Athletic Association.  This was good enough for a 3rd-place finish in the conference regular season standings.

Schedule and results

References

Missouri
Missouri Tigers men's basketball seasons
Tiger
Tiger